Moirangthem Basanta Singh (born 3 April 1994, in Manipur) is an Indian professional footballer who plays as a midfielder for Mohun Bagan in the I-League.

Career

Mohammedan
Basanta made his professional debut for Mohammedan on 8 March 2014 against Mohun Bagan A.C. at the Salt Lake Stadium in which he played till 57th minute before being replaced by Ashim Biswas as Mohammedan drew the match 0–0.

Career statistics

References

External links 
 Profile at Goal.com

1994 births
Living people
Indian footballers
Mohammedan SC (Kolkata) players
Association football midfielders
Footballers from Manipur
I-League players